Martin Šrot (born 10 August 1938) is a Slovenian gymnast. He competed at the 1964 Summer Olympics and the 1968 Summer Olympics.

References

1938 births
Living people
Slovenian male artistic gymnasts
Olympic gymnasts of Yugoslavia
Gymnasts at the 1964 Summer Olympics
Gymnasts at the 1968 Summer Olympics
Sportspeople from Celje